The Arg of Karim Khan (Arg-e Karim Khān) or Karim Khan Citadel, is a citadel located in downtown Shiraz, Iran. It was built as part of a complex during the Zand dynasty. It is named after Karim Khan, and served as his living quarters. It is rectangular in shape and resembles a medieval fortress.

In the past, the citadel was sometimes used as a prison. Today, it is a museum operated by Iran's Cultural Heritage Organization. A public park surrounds it.

History

Karim Khan citadel is located at the beginning of Karim Khan Zand (Shiraz) street on the corner of the Municipality Square (Shahrdari). Karim Khan was influenced by the Safavid architecture when his government was established in Shiraz. So that after visiting Isfahan Naghshe Jahan Square, he decided to build a large square in the northern Shiraz. This field was known as Artillery Square. To the north of the square, located Divan Karim Khan Square and to its east, Vakil Bazaar and several inns. To the south of the square, were located Hammam Vakil and Vakil Mosque. On the southwest, there was a garden, and to the west, the Arg citadel. After the conquest of Shiraz by Mohammad Khan, he decided to demolish the buildings of Karim Khan in a hostility to Karim Khan. Following this decision, a number of Zandiyah era buildings were demolished, including the border fence built around Shiraz by Karim Khan. Fortunately, the Arg citadel was protected from demolition and was used as an emirate court appointed by the central government to Amiri and the Fars governorate.  

The Arg of Karim Khan was built in 1180 AH (1766-7). Karim Khan invited the best architects and artists of the time and bought the best materials from other cities and abroad for the construction of the castle of Karim Khan, which was quickly constructed. During the Zand dynasty it was used by the king as living quarters. During the Qajar period it was used as the governor's seat.

Prince Abdolhosein Mirza Farmanfarma, governor of Fars Province, ordered the miniatures in the castle to be renovated.

After the fall of the Qajar dynasty it was converted into a prison and the paintings were plastered over. In 1971 it was given to Iran's Cultural Heritage Organization. The renovation of the castle started in 1977.

Description

Karim Khan Castle is located at Shahrdari Square. It has a land area of 4,000 m2 and is in the center of a 12,800 m2 compound. The Citadel of Karim Khan consists of four high walls connected by four 14 m round brick towers at a 90-degree angle. Each 12 m wall is 3 meters thick at the base and 2.8 meters at the top. The design of the citadel combines military and residential architecture, for it was the home of Karim Khan and the military center of the dynasty.

James Edward Alexander in 1827 described the citadel as being surrounded by a "deep wet ditch".

Tile works depicting legendary tales were added at the entrance gate of the citadel during the Qajar Era.

Gallery

See also
Batonis Tsikhe
Iranian architecture
List of castles in Iran

References

External links
MIT's Archnet entry for "Arg-e Karimi
Map of Arg of Karim Khan

Infrastructure completed in 1767
Architecture in Iran
Castles in Iran
Buildings and structures in Shiraz
Museums in Iran
Palaces in Iran
Tourist attractions in Shiraz
1767 establishments in Iran
National works of Iran